Voltage-dependent calcium channel gamma-1 subunit is a protein that in humans is encoded by the CACNG1 gene.

L-type calcium channels are composed of five subunits. The protein encoded by this gene represents one of these subunits, gamma, and is one of several gamma subunit proteins. This particular gamma subunit is part of skeletal muscle 1,4-dihydropyridine-sensitive calcium channels and is an integral membrane protein that plays a role in excitation-contraction coupling. This gene is a member of the neuronal calcium channel gamma subunit gene subfamily of the PMP-22/EMP/MP20 family and is located in a cluster with two similar gamma subunit-encoding genes.

See also
 Voltage-dependent calcium channel

References

Further reading

External links 
 
 

Ion channels